Colosseum Live is a live album by Colosseum, released in 1971. It was one of the band's most commercially successful albums, remaining in the UK Albums Chart for six weeks and peaking at number 17. The album peaked at number 48 in Australia in 1972.

This album was recorded at Manchester University (March 18, 1971) and the Big Apple, Brighton (March 27, 1971), on the Daughter of Time tour. After Colosseum Live, the band broke up for 23 years and reunited in 1994 with exactly the same line-up..

Reception
Allmusic wrote that "With good material, some towering performances, and a powerful atmosphere, this is everything you could hope for from a live album." They made note of the performances of all the players except Dave Greenslade, and commented that the band arrangements, duets during the fills, and the way solos flow from one to the other are all interesting and effective.

Track listing 
 "Rope Ladder to the Moon" (Pete Brown, Jack Bruce) – 9:43
 "Walking in the Park" (Graham Bond) – 8:21
 "Skelington" (Dave Clempson, Jon Hiseman) – 14:52
 "Tanglewood '63" (Mike Gibbs) – 10:12
 "Encore... "Stormy Monday Blues"" (T-Bone Walker) – 7:29
 "Lost Angeles" (Dave Greenslade, Dick Heckstall-Smith, Chris Farlowe) – 15:43
 "I Can't Live Without You" (James Litherland) – 7:28  [Bonus Track on later edition CD]

Personnel 
Colosseum
 Mark Clarke - bass, vocals
 Dave "Clem" Clempson - guitars, vocals
 Chris Farlowe - vocals
 Dave Greenslade - organ, vibraphone
 Dick Heckstall-Smith - saxophones
 Jon Hiseman - drums

References 

Colosseum (band) live albums
1971 live albums
Bronze Records live albums
Warner Records live albums
Castle Communications live albums
Albums produced by Gerry Bron
Albums produced by Mark Clarke
Albums produced by Clem Clempson
Albums produced by Chris Farlowe
Albums produced by Dave Greenslade
Albums produced by Dick Heckstall-Smith
Albums produced by Jon Hiseman